Joni Aho (born 12 April 1986) is a Finnish former professional footballer who played as a right-back.

International career
Aho was part of the Finland U21s during the 2009 UEFA European Under-21 Championship in Sweden.

In early 2009, Aho was called up to the Finland senior squad. He made his debut in a friendly against Japan on 4 February, starting in the 5–1 loss.

References

External links
 
 
 

1986 births
Living people
Finnish footballers
Finland international footballers
Finland under-21 international footballers
People from Kaarina
Veikkausliiga players
FC Lahti players
FC Inter Turku players
Association football defenders
Sportspeople from Southwest Finland